Zdeněk Ščasný (born 9 August 1957) is a Czech football manager and former player.

Ščasný has won the Czech league championship five timesthree times as a player and twice as a coachand the Czech Cup three timestwice as a player and once as a coach.

He is best known for his years with Sparta Pragueboth as a player and a manager. He played as a defender and also in midfield. He has also coached Greek giants Panathinaikos.

Playing career

Early career, Dukla Prague and first title
Zdenek Ščasný in his youth played for Spartak Roudnice nad Labem. At 17 years old he moved to Dukla Prague, where he made his Czechoslovak First League debut. Ščasný spent four years with Dukla Prague, and won the Czechoslovak First League in 1976-77.

Sparta Prague and more titles
In 1978 Ščasný moved to Sparta Prague, where he remained until 1985. With Sparta, Ščasný won the Czechoslovak Cup in 1979–80, a Czechoslovak League and Cup double in 1983-84, and the league again in 1984-85.

Late career
In 1985 Ščasný joined Bohemians, playing there for four and a half seasons. After Bohemians Ščasný played with Agro Slušovice for a short time and then moved to Cyprus to play for Anagennisi Dherynia before ending his playing career.

International career
During his career Ščasný earned four caps as a Czechoslovakia national team player, making his debut against Cyprus on 27 March 1983. He also made five appearances for the Czechoslovakia national under-21 football team in 1979.

Managerial career

Early career
Ščasný began his coaching career by acting as a player-coach at Anagennisi Dherynia, and he later supervised the youth there.

Ščasný returned to his homeland in 1993, and, after working with some smaller clubs, he became an assistant coach at Sparta Prague in 1996.

Sparta Prague
In the middle of the 1997–98 season Ščasný took over as Sparta's head coach and led the team to the 1. Liga championship. The following season Ščasný and Sparta repeated as league champions.

FK Viktoria Žižkov
After his second league championship with Sparta, Ščasný took over Viktoria Žižkov in 1999–2000. Ščasný spent three seasons with Žižkov, guiding them to great improvement year after year, as the team finished 9th-place in 1999–2000, 5th-place in 2000–01, and 3rd-placethe club's highest-ever finishin 2001–02. In 2000–01 Ščasný led Žižkov to win the Czech Cup in 2000–01the club's first title since 1993–94.

Greece: OFI Crete and Panathinaikos
After leaving Žižkov, Ščasný moved to Greece to be the head coach of OFI Crete. Ščasný led OFI to an 8th-place finish in his first season with the club.
Scasny had very poor relations with many of the players at OFI and by the time he left the club the situation between him and many of the players was terrible.

His work at OFI led Greek giants Panathinaikos to hire him early in the 2004–05 season to replace Itzhak Shum. Ščasný took over in the middle of Panathinaikos' UEFA Champions League campaign, and with two impressive draws against Arsenal, another draw in Norway against Rosenborg and a resounding win over PSV Eindhoven in Athens, Ščasný guided the Greek side to finish 3rd in a difficult group, thus moving them to the UEFA Cup. Before Panathinaikos began the UEFA Cup competition later that season though, Ščasný was replaced in favor of Alberto Malesani.

FK SIAD Most
In the middle of the 2005–06 season modest Czech side FK SIAD Most was in its first-ever season in the Czech top flight, and was in danger of being relegated right back to the second division. Most turned to Ščasný during the winter break, Ščasný helped Most stay in the top flight that season, boosting the team to a surprising 10th-place finish. In the 2006–07 Gambrinus liga Ščasný's Most finished 12th and again remained in the first division. However, Ščasný left Most at the end of the season by mutual consent.

Mladá Boleslav
After leaving Most, Ščasný took over at Mladá Boleslav early in the 2007–08 season. Boleslav was competing in the UEFA Cup that season, and in the first round of the competition Ščasný helped Boleslav pull off a stunning elimination of Italian club Palermo by winning 1–0 in the second leg of the tie in Italy. In the group stage of the competition, Boleslav finished 4th, behind Villarreal, Fiorentina and AEK Athens. Boleslav parted ways with Ščasný before the end of the season.

Return to FK Viktoria Žižkov
In the middle of the 2008–09 season Žižkov were bottom of the table and likely to be relegated. Žižkov turned to Ščasný for help for the final 16 matches of the season, but it was too late - Ščasný could not save the club and they were relegated to the second division.

Debreceni VSC
On 30 December 2010 Ščasný signed a two-year contract with Hungarian champions, Debreceni VSC. On 16 April 2011, he left the Hungarian club, after he failed to deliver sufficient wins.

Return to Czech football
In October 2012 Ščasný returned to Czech football after a three-year absence, taking over at FK Teplice.

Personal life
Zdenek's son Michal and daughter Pavlína are both professional footballers.

Managerial statistics

Honours

As player
Dukla Prague
Czechoslovak First League: 1976–77

Sparta Prague
Czechoslovak First League: 1983–84, 1984–85
Czechoslovak Cup: 1979–80, 1983–84

As manager
Sparta Prague
1. Liga: 1997–98, 1998–99, runner-up 2014-15, runner-up 2015–16

Viktoria Žižkov
Czech Cup: 2000–01
1. Liga: 3rd place 2001–02

References

1957 births
Living people
Footballers from Brno
Association football defenders
Association football midfielders
Czech footballers
Czech football managers
Czech expatriate football managers
Czech First League managers
Czechoslovak footballers
Czechoslovakia under-21 international footballers
Czechoslovakia international footballers
Cypriot Second Division players
Bohemians 1905 players
Dukla Prague footballers
AC Sparta Prague players
Anagennisi Deryneia FC players
AC Sparta Prague managers
OFI Crete F.C. managers
Debreceni VSC managers
FK Baník Most managers
FK Mladá Boleslav managers
FK Viktoria Žižkov managers
FK Teplice managers
Expatriate footballers in Cyprus
Czechoslovak expatriate footballers
Czechoslovak expatriate sportspeople in Cyprus
FK Ústí nad Labem managers
Nemzeti Bajnokság I managers